The following concepts can be abbreviated DCFS  
Department of Children and Family Services, the name of a governmental agency in some states in the United States
 Department of Children and Family Services (Los Angeles County)
Descriptional Complexity of Formal Systems, a computer science conference

See also
Department for Children, Schools and Families (DCSF), British government department responsible for all issues affecting people up to the age of 19 including child protection and education